Head Like a Rock is a 1994 concept album released on 4 July 1994. by Ian McNabb. The album was nominated for the 1994 Mercury Music Prize and was McNabb's second solo album. The album was recorded in Los Angeles with the backing band Crazy Horse. The album peaked at No. 29 on the official UK charts.

Late in 2012, Ian revealed that his first three studio albums were to be re-released as 'expanded editions'; subsequently, in early December 2013, 'Head Like a Rock (Expanded edition)' was announced on Amazon with a scheduled release date of January 28, 2013: "This expanded version has been re-mastered by Ian himself and is a testament to the great album it was, enhanced with upgraded packaging and a bonus disc of the B-sides that came with the assorted singles. This is a great addition to the canon of Ian's work"

Track listing
All tracks composed by Ian McNabb
 "Fire Inside My Soul" (8:35)
 "You Must Be Prepared to Dream" (6:57)
 "Child Inside a Father" (9:02)
 "Still Got the Fever" (7:29)
 "Potency"(4:38)
 "Go Into the Light" (4:08)
 "As a Life Goes By" (4:42)
 "Sad Strange Solitary Catholic Mystic" (4:45)
 "This Time Is Forever"(5:38)
 "May You Always" (10:51)

Personnel
Ian McNabb - guitar, vocals
John Porter - acoustic guitar, keyboards; dobro on "As a Life Goes By"
Billy Talbot - bass, backing vocals
Ralph Molina - drums, backing vocals; co-lead vocals on "Child Inside a Father"
Tommy Eyre - organ; piano on "This Time is Forever"; synthesizer and string arrangement on "Sad Strange Solitary Catholic Mystic"
James Hutchinson - bass
Joseph Modeliste - drums
Tony Braunagel - percussion
Greg Leisz - pedal steel guitar; lap steel on "Potency"
Scarlet Rivera - violin on "Potency" and "Sad Strange Solitary Catholic Mystic"
Roy Corkill - acoustic guitar, bass
Mike "Tone" Hamilton - rhythm guitar, backing vocals
Nick Warren - keyboards on "Still Got the Fever" and "This Time is Forever"
Martin Tillman - cello on "Potency" and "Sad Strange Solitary Catholic Mystic"
Marty Grebb - alto saxophone on "Go Into the Light"
Maxi Anderson, Mona Lisa Young, Terry Young - backing vocals
Technical
Joe McGrath - engineer
Ian McNabb, Pete Schwier - mixing
Phil Smee - design
Theo Westenberger - front cover photography of Reggie J. Trickpus (Alan Ende Ventriloquist Collection)

References

1994 albums
Ian McNabb albums
Albums produced by John Porter (musician)